John Hooker (1816-1901) was an American lawyer, judge, and abolitionist as well as a reformer for women's rights. He married Isabella Beecher Hooker in 1841 and lived in Farmington and Hartford, Connecticut. With his brother-in-law, Francis Gillette, he purchased 140 acres in 1853, and they established the Hartford neighborhood known as "Nook Farm." Nook Farm was a community of reformers, politicians, writers and friends; Harriet Beecher Stowe, Mark Twain, Isabella Beecher Hooker, Francis Gillette, and Charles Dudley Warner were the most famous residents.

Life and career

In John Hooker's memoir Some Reminiscences of a Long Life, he mentioned that he was the son of Edward Hooker, who was the fifth in direct descent from Thomas Hooker, the first minister of the First Church of Hartford and the founder of Connecticut. John Hooker also experienced the Amistad case first hand in Farmington, Connecticut. His memoir alludes to the fact that his law office in Farmington on the store's second floor in the 1840s. His office was also next to an African men from Amistad captives. The building was originally on Main Street next to the Deming's house, and later moved to the Mill Lane in the 1930s.

John and Isabella Beecher Hooker raised three children in their home in Nook Farm at the corner of Forest and Hawthorn Streets. Under his wife's influence, he was an advocate in the women's rights movement and supported his sister-in-law, Harriet Beecher Stowe, during the initiation of her activist career. John and Isabella Beecher Hooker composed "A Woman's Property Bill", published in 1877.

John Hooker was an active abolitionist throughout his legal career. For instance, he was instrumental in helping Reverend James W.C. Pennington gain his freedom from his Maryland slave owner for $150 when Reverend Pennington was a minister at the Talcott Street Congregational Church, an African-American church in Hartford, Connecticut. This financial arrangement helped Pennington feel safe in the north, and Reverend Pennington returned from exile in Europe to continue his career as an African-American minister. John Hooker was also the president of an anti-slavery committee in Hartford and organized the liberty convention on October 27, 1846.

John Hooker served as a congregational deacon, and he also accepted the beliefs of the Spiritualism movement whose members thought it was possible to communicate with spirits of the dead.

Charter Oak Newspaper (1838)
Charter Oak was an anti-slavery 19th century newspaper. It was published by the Connecticut Anti-Slavery Society of Hartford, and the Charter Oak's masthead carried the motto, "Free Principles–Free Men–Free Speech–And A Free Press. Digital copies can be found at the Connecticut State Library's Newspapers of Connecticut collection.

Married Women's Property Act
Married Women's Property Act, or A Woman's Property Bill, was a Connecticut state act that was enacted in 1877. It contributed to women's rights movement and aimed to give women more "power" within the family. The act states: "This legislation enabled a married woman to control her own property and to sue and to be sued in the same manner as her husband."

References

External links 

 History of the first African-American Church in Hartford, Connecticut
 Charter Oak Newspaper
 Farmington Historical Society
 Hartford Historical Society

American abolitionists
1816 births
1901 deaths
People from Farmington, Connecticut
People from Hartford, Connecticut
Activists from Connecticut
American suffragists